Andoharano is a genus of African crevice weavers that was first described by Pekka T. Lehtinen in 1967.

Species
 it contains twelve species:
Andoharano ansieae Zonstein & Marusik, 2015 – Namibia
Andoharano decaryi (Fage, 1945) (type) – Madagascar
Andoharano grandidieri (Simon, 1901) – Madagascar
Andoharano griswoldi Magalhaes & Grismado, 2019 – Madagascar
Andoharano lehtineni Magalhaes & Grismado, 2019 – Madagascar
Andoharano milloti Legendre, 1972 – Madagascar
Andoharano monodi Legendre, 1972 – Madagascar
Andoharano ramirezi Magalhaes & Grismado, 2019 – Madagascar
Andoharano rollardae Magalhaes & Grismado, 2019 – Madagascar
Andoharano simoni Magalhaes & Grismado, 2019 – Madagascar
Andoharano woodae Magalhaes & Grismado, 2019 – Madagascar
Andoharano zonsteini Magalhaes & Grismado, 2019 – Madagascar

References

Araneomorphae genera
Filistatidae
Spiders of Africa
Taxa named by Pekka T. Lehtinen